John Michael Seigenthaler (born December 21, 1955) is an American news anchor and a member of
the George Foster Peabody Awards board of jurors. He is well known as a former weekend anchor and correspondent for both NBC and MSNBC. He is the son of the late newspaper journalist John Lawrence Seigenthaler, and named for his father. He is best known for his eight-year tenure as weekend anchor of NBC Nightly News. In July 2008, Seigenthaler joined his family company Seigenthaler Public Relations, but continued to be based in New York. From 2013–2016 he worked for the now defunct Al Jazeera America as its evening news anchor.

Life and career
Seigenthaler is a graduate of Father Ryan High School and Duke University, where he received a bachelor of science degree in public policy in 1978.

Seigenthaler began his television news career in 1980 as a writer and producer at WNGE-TV (now WKRN-TV) in Nashville, Tennessee. From 1981-90, he reported and produced for WSMV-TV, Nashville and also hosted a weekday public affairs show. From there he moved to KOMO-TV in Seattle, where he anchored the weekend evening news.

In January 1992, he married KOMO weeknight anchor Kerry Brock, who later joined him at the Weekend Anchor Desk at KOMO. Then he moved back to Nashville, where he co-anchored the evening news for WKRN-TV.

In September 1999, he became the main temporary co-host on Weekend Today with  Soledad O'Brien. He returned in 2003, following the death of David Bloom.

In 1996, he was one of the rotating Sunday anchors, became main Sunday anchor in 1998. Seigenthaler served as the anchor for the weekend edition of NBC Nightly News for more than seven years of his 11-year tenure with NBC News. Seigenthaler announced during his April 1, 2007 newscast that it was his final broadcast as anchor of the weekend edition of NBC Nightly News. He also hosted the television shows Lockup and MSNBC Investigates on MSNBC. NBC News President Steve Capus said Seigenthaler's contract was not renewed because the network could no longer afford the luxury of employing a staff member whose primary duty was anchoring the weekend evening news programs. The network announced in October 2006 that job cuts and consolidation of operations would slice some $750 million from parent NBC Universal's budget by 2008.

After NBC, he worked for the Associated Press until joining Seigenthaler Public Relations in July 2008. In 2013 he began work for Al Jazeera America as the anchorman for its one-hour prime time news broadcasts at 8pm eastern and 11pm eastern time.

Seigenthaler lives in Weston, Connecticut with his wife and son.

Journalism awards
Two-time Emmy Award recipient
Recipient of the Robert F. Kennedy Television News award
Recipient of the National Headliner Award
Recipient of the American Bar Association Award
Iris Award winner
Recipient of the Al Neuharth Award

Bibliography

References

External links

American broadcast news analysts
American television reporters and correspondents
Place of birth missing (living people)
News & Documentary Emmy Award winners
Sanford School of Public Policy alumni
People from Nashville, Tennessee
1955 births
Living people
Al Jazeera people
NBC News people
Television anchors from Seattle
CNBC people
People from Weston, Connecticut